The 2007 European Junior and U23 Canoe Slalom Championships took place in Kraków, Poland from 2 to 5 August 2007 under the auspices of the European Canoe Association (ECA) at the Kraków-Kolna Canoe Slalom Course. It was the 9th edition of the competition for Juniors (U18) and the 5th edition for the Under 23 category. A total of 15 medal events took place. The junior men's C2 team event did not take place.

Medal summary

Men

Canoe

Junior

U23

Kayak

Junior

U23

Women

Kayak

Junior

U23

Medal table

References

External links
European Canoe Association

European Junior and U23 Canoe Slalom Championships
European Junior and U23 Canoe Slalom Championships